Fashionably Late with Stacy London was an American late-night talk and variety show on TLC hosted by Stacy London. As of February 8, 2008, the show no longer appeared on TLC's TV show schedule.

The show aired weekly on Friday night at 10 pm EST. The show was filmed before a live studio audience and features a wide range of topics such as fashion, relationships, entertainment, celebrity gossip and fashion makeovers. Celebrity guests were also brought on the show to discuss current fashion trends.

References 

2007 American television series debuts
2007 American television series endings
2000s American late-night television series
2000s American television talk shows
English-language television shows
TLC (TV network) original programming